The floral banded wobbegong (Orectolobus floridus) is a recently described species of carpet shark found in the Indian Ocean, at depths of 42 to 85 meters, off southwestern Australia. The physical characteristics consist of a striking color pattern of yellowish-brown bands, blotches, spots, and reticulations.

References 

floral banded wobbegong
Marine fish of Western Australia
Taxa named by Peter R. Last
Taxa named by Justin A. Chidlow
floral banded wobbegong